These are the official results of the Women's 4 × 400 m Relay event at the 1996 Summer Olympics in Atlanta, Georgia. There were 15 nations competing.

In the penultimate race ever in Centennial Stadium, Olabisi Afolabi put Nigeria out in front, with Merlene Frazer very close at the handoff.  Fatima Yusuf extended the Nigerian lead out to about 8 metres,  Handing off in sixth place, Maicel Malone brought USA into second place, but Russian Svetlana Goncharenko, starting her leg in fifth place, followed Malone and overtook her on the final straight.  With Nigeria comfortably in front, the second exchange saw the field bunch as the next six teams exchanged within a couple of steps of one another.  Coming out of the scrum, Russia maintained second place followed by USA, while Cuba's Surella Morales found herself flat on her face before the end of the first turn.  Down the backstretch Kim Graham ran USA past Russia's Yekaterina Kulikova, while Jamaica's Juliet Campbell ran wide to stay out of trouble, but opened the door for Germany's Anja Rücker to join the chase.  Through the second turn, back from her drug suspension, Charity Opara's lead began to shrink as Graham began to separate from the pack.  Under the challenge, Opara began to tie up, Graham cruised by to hand off to Jearl Miles with a 4-metre advantage.  Nigeria's bronze medalist Falilat Ogunkoya chased Miles leaving Jamaica's hurdle gold medalist Deon Hemmings to battle Germany's drug cheat Grit Breuer.  Campbell closed quickly to give Hemmings the edge over Breuer, but Ogunkoya made it clear she was not going to battle for bronze, putting a gap on Hemmings and Breuer quickly from the pass.  Ogunkoya's focus was on Miles, gaining steadily until the final straight, reducing the gap to less than a metre.  Miles was gritting her teeth, trying to hold off Ogunkoya.  Coming off the turn, she looked to be struggling as Ogunkoya gained, Miles drifting into lane 2 to give Ogunkoya the direct route to victory.  But Miles didn't let her by, holding the edge all the way to the finish line for American gold.  Behind them, Hemmings held the advantage over Breuer until the final straight, then Breuer unleashed a sprint that left Hemmings and was nipping at Ogunkoya's heels, giving the German team the bronze.

Medalists

* Athletes who participated in the heats only and received medals.

Results

Heats
Qualification: First 3 in each heat (Q) and the next 2 fastest (q) qualified to the final.

Final

See also
Men's 4 × 400 m Relay

References

External links
 Official Report
 Results

R
Relay foot races at the Olympics
1996 in women's athletics
Women's events at the 1996 Summer Olympics